Leptospermum brachyandrum is a species of shrub or small tree that is endemic to eastern Australia. It has smooth bark, linear to lance-shaped leaves and white flowers and usually grows along creeks, often in water.

Description
Young stems are slender and densely hairy at first. Flowering occurs from November to January and the fruit is a woody capsule  in diameter.

Taxonomy and naming
This tea-tree was first formally described in 1919 by Ferdinand von Mueller who gave it the name Kunzea brachyandra and published the description in the journal Fragmenta phytographiae Australiae. In 1917, George Claridge Druce changed the name to Leptospermum brachyandrum. The specific epithet (brachyandrum) is derived from ancient Greek words meaning "short" and "male", referring to the stamens which are shorter than those of kunzeas.

Distribution and habitat
Leptospermum brachyandrum usually grows in shrubby forest along rocky creeks, often in water. It is found in coastal and near-coastal areas from North Queensland to Port Macquarie in northern New South Wales.

References

brachyandrum
Myrtales of Australia
Flora of New South Wales
Flora of Queensland
Plants described in 1917
Taxa named by Ferdinand von Mueller